Hubert Humphrey (1911–1978) was the 38th vice president of the United States.

Hubert Humphrey may also refer to:
Hubert H. Humphrey III, known as Skip Humphrey (born 1942), his son, Minnesotan politician, Minnesota Attorney General, 1983–1999
Hubert H. Humphrey Metrodome, a stadium in Minneapolis

See also
Hubert Humphreys (1878–1967), British socialist activist
Hubert D. Humphreys (1923–2009), historian